New Albany Township is a township in Story County, Iowa, USA.  As of the 2000 census, its population was 1,221.

Geography
According to the USGS, it contains two cemeteries: Colo Cemetery and Saint James Cemetery.

 U.S. Route 30 runs east–west through the township and  U.S. Route 65 runs north–south.

References

External links
 US-Counties.com
 City-Data.com
 USGS Geographic Names Information System (GNIS)

Townships in Story County, Iowa
Townships in Iowa